Spencer is a village in Spencer Township located in Medina County, Ohio, United States. The population was 753 at the 2010 census.

History
A post office called Spencer has been in operation since 1849. The village takes its name from Spencer Township.

Geography
Spencer is located at  (41.099755, -82.122854).

Demographics

2010 census
As of the census of 2010, there were 753 people, 283 households, and 203 families living in the village. The racial makeup of the village was 97.5% White, 0.1% African American, 0.1% Native American, 0.3% Asian, 0.5% from other races, and 1.5% from two or more races. Hispanic or Latino of any race were 3.1% of the population.

There were 283 households, of which 37.1% had children under the age of 18 living with them, 56.2% were married couples living together, 9.9% had a female householder with no husband present, 5.7% had a male householder with no wife present, and 28.3% were non-families. 23.0% of all households were made up of individuals, and 13.1% had someone living alone who was 65 years of age or older. The average household size was 2.66 and the average family size was 3.09.

The median age in the village was 37.3 years. 27.5% of residents were under the age of 18; 8.3% were between the ages of 18 and 24; 25.7% were from 25 to 44; 24.3% were from 45 to 64; and 13.9% were 65 years of age or older. The gender makeup of the village was 49.4% male and 50.6% female.

2000 census
As of the census of 2000, there were 747 people, 285 households, and 204 families living in the village. The population density was 755.8 people per square mile (291.3/km). There were 296 housing units at an average density of 299.5 per square mile (115.4/km). The racial makeup of the village was 99.06% White, 0.54% Native American, 0.13% Asian, and 0.27% from two or more races. Hispanic or Latino of any race were 0.80% of the population.

There were 285 households, out of which 37.9% had children under the age of 18 living with them, 57.9% were married couples living together, 9.8% had a female householder with no husband present, and 28.1% were non-families. 21.4% of all households were made up of individuals, and 9.1% had someone living alone who was 65 years of age or older. The average household size was 2.62 and the average family size was 3.09.

In the village, the population was spread out, with 30.0% under the age of 18, 6.8% from 18 to 24, 32.1% from 25 to 44, 20.6% from 45 to 64, and 10.4% who were 65 years of age or older. The median age was 34 years. For every 100 females there were 95.5 males. For every 100 females age 18 and over, there were 93.0 males.

The median income for a household in the village was $37,404, and the median income for a family was $42,500. Males had a median income of $35,556 versus $25,278 for females. The per capita income for the village was $16,708. About 2.0% of families and 3.9% of the population were below the poverty line, including 2.9% of those under age 18 and 6.3% of those age 65 or over.

References

External links
 Medina County Community Advocate

Villages in Medina County, Ohio
Villages in Ohio